{{infobox ethnic group
| group            = Palembang
| native_name      = | image            = Suku Palembang.jpg
| population       = 3,800,000
| popplace         =  (South Sumatra)
| langs            = NativePalembangAlsoIndonesianMalay
| rels             = Islam
| related          = Malays, Javanese, Minangkabau
}}

The Palembang or Palembangese people (Palembang language: Uwong Pelémbang), also known as Palembangese Malay''' (Jawi: ملايو ڤلامبڠ) are an ethnic group that inhabits the interior parts of South Sumatra province, Indonesia.

There are approximately 3,800,000 Palembangese living in Indonesia. They speak Palembang, which is a variant of Malay language in Sumatra and also has been influenced by Javanese since parts of South Sumatra used to be under direct Javanese rule for quite a long time, the speech varieties of Palembang and its surrounding area are significantly influenced by Javanese, down to their core vocabularies.

See also

 Malays (ethnic group)
 Javanese people
 Palembang language
 Palembang cuisine

References

Indigenous peoples of Southeast Asia
Ethnic groups in Indonesia
Ethnic groups in Sumatra
Muslim communities of Indonesia
Malay people